Paul Sika is an Ivorian fashion and advertising photographer/creative director/artist, who was born on 7 January 1985, in Abidjan, Côte d'Ivoire.

He studied software engineering at University of Westminster, United Kingdom between 2003 and 2007 and became a freelance photographer in 2008. In 2009 he was awarded a Chinua Achebe Center Fellowship. 

His works consist of the vibrant views of Africa in Technicolor- saturation, they are in general oversaturated color shots. In his works; he creates carefully staged environments using actors.

When he discovered American artist Andy Warhol; he referred to himself as Warhol's grandson. He said ""When I saw LaChapelle's work, I thought, this is amazing. How can someone have such imagination? And when you go back in history, David LaChappelle was mentored by Andy Warhol. So it was more of the artistic-father thing, that's why I referred to myself as Andy Warhol's grandson."  

As CNN World wrote; "Ivorian artist Paul Sika is no ordinary photographer. His "one-frame films" are eye-catching explosions of color, falling somewhere between cinema and photography.
The influence of the big screen is obvious in Sika's photographs, which resemble stills from an ultra-stylish, slightly surreal movie shot in glorious Technicolor."

Exhibitions
 November 2008 Galerie Le Lab, Abidjan
 October 2009 Chinua Achebe Center, New York

Bibliography
 "At the Heart of Me" 8x10 inches, 80 pgs,  (Hard Cover) /  (Soft Cover)

See also

 Contemporary African Art
 Culture of Côte d'Ivoire

External links
 Official homepage of Paul Sika
 "Ivorian artist Paul Sika's glorious Technicolor world " on CNN, written by Mark Tutton on May 10, 2010 
 "Paul Sika Photography" on Cool Hunting
 An interview with Paul Sika
  "Creativity knows no limits" article by Belinda Otas dated February 01,2010 on The Africa Report
  An audio interview with Paul Sika on BBC

Ivorian photographers
People from Abidjan
Living people
1985 births